San Lorenzo alle Rose is a Romanesque-style, Roman Catholic church located on Vicolo Rose #7 in Impruneta, in the region of the Metropolitan city of Florence, Italy.

History
A church at the site was founded around the year 1000; the facade is a rough stone and brick. The meaning of the suffix alle Rose is unclear; it may reflect the flora of the site or the early patronage of the Rossi family, landowners in the region. The church was later patronized by the Grifoni family. 

The church has undergone numerous refurbishments, and lost much of the original Romanesque style. The facade has a portico with Tuscan columns. The main altarpiece is a 16th-century Annunciation with Saints attributed to the Maestro di Serumido. The lateral stone altars added about that same time include altarpieces depicting San Nicola di Bari (1596) by Andrea Boscoli and Saints Dominic and Catherine by Francesco Curradi. A Madonna and Child by Taddeo Gaddi is now in a lateral chapel to the left of the presbytery.

Gallery

References

Roman Catholic churches in Florence
11th-century Roman Catholic church buildings in Italy
Romanesque architecture in Florence
Impruneta